The Gdovka is a river in Gdovsky District of Pskov Oblast, Russia. The source of the river is the Pyosy Mokh swamp. The Gdovka is a tributary of Lake Peipus. The town of Gdov and the village of Ustye are located on the banks of the Gdovka.

References 

Rivers of Pskov Oblast